Gollum browser is a web application for accessing the encyclopedia, Wikipedia.  Gollum is no longer accessible online.

Gollum is designed to browse Wikipedia in an easier way than directly using the web browser. Links external to Wikipedia are opened in the user's regular browser. Gollum is opened from a regular browser and makes a window that puts the Wikipedia search bar on the toolbar. Gollum was created by Harald Hanek in 2005 using PHP and Ajax. According to one blogger, Gollum provides a way to bypass censorship of Wikipedia in China.

Languages
Though the website is available only in English and German, Gollum's GUI is available in more than 32 languages and can browse nearly 50 Wikipedia editions.

Gollum's GUI

 Arabic
 Indonesian
 Bulgarian
 Catalan
 Chinese
 Czech
 Danish
 German
 Estonian
 Greek
 English
 Spanish
 French
 Hebrew
 Croatian
 Italian
 Japanese
 Korean
 Luxembourgish
 Hungarian
 Dutch
 Norwegian
 Norwegian Nynorsk
 Polish
 Portuguese
 Romanian
 Russian
 Finnish
 Swedish
 Tagalog

Browsable Wikipedia editions

 Arabic
 Bulgarian
 Bosnian
 Catalan
 Chinese
 Croatian
 Czech
 Danish
 Dutch
 English
 Esperanto
 Estonian
 Finnish
 French
 German
 Greek
 Hebrew
 Hungarian
 Icelandic
 Indonesian
 Italian
 * Japanese
 Korean
 Kurdish
 Latin
 Luxembourgish
 Limburgan
 Low German
 Norwegian
 Norwegian Nynorsk
 Persian
 Polish
 Portuguese
 Pushto
 Romanian
 Russian
 Slovak
 Slovenian
 Serbian
 Serbo-Croatian
 Spanish
 Swedish
 Swiss German
 Tagalog
 Turkish
 Ukrainian
 Walloon
 Western Frisian
 Yiddish

See also
 Site-specific browser

References

External links
 

Ajax (programming)
Web applications
Web browsers